Balligomingo is an electronic music project by Garrett Schwartz and Vic Levak.  Their music has been compared to that of Delerium, Massive Attack,  Conjure One, Mythos, Nitin Sawhney and Enigma. Vocalist Jody Quine is featured on the 2009 album Under an Endless Sky. They are named after a road in Gulph Mills, Pennsylvania, which was named after the Lenni-Lenape word for the area.

Albums
Beneath the Surface (2002)
Under an Endless Sky (2009)
Remix, Vol. 1 (2011)

External links
[ Allmusic entry for Balligomingo]
Beneath The Surface Album Review
Balligomingo Official Site

American electronic music groups